Agrippa is a lunar impact crater that is located at the southeast edge of the Mare Vaporum. It is located to the north of the crater Godin, the irregular Tempel lies just to the east. To the north and northeast, the rille designated Rima Ariadaeus follows a course to the east-southeast, reaching the western edge of Mare Tranquillitatis. It is named after the 1st century Greek astronomer Agrippa.

The rim of Agrippa has an unusual shape, resembling the form of a shield with a rounded southern rim and a more angular northern half. The interior is somewhat irregular, with a central rise at the midpoint. The crater is from the Eratosthenian period, which lasted from 3.2 to 1.1 billion years ago.

Satellite craters
By convention these features are identified on lunar maps by placing the letter on the side of the crater midpoint that is closest to Agrippa. Agrippa B is to the north, Agrippa D and G are further west, Agrippa E is nearly northwest which is attached to another satellite crater Agrippa S, Agrippa F is not far to the east and Agrippa H is north-northeast touching the main crater.

Gallery

References

External links

Agrippa at The Moon Wiki
 , regarding Agrippa and Godin craters
 , regarding Agrippa, Godin, Torricelli and Eratosthenes craters

Impact craters on the Moon
Eratosthenian